Microbacterium indicum is a bacterium from the genus Microbacterium which has been isolated from deep-sea sediments from the Chagos Trench in the Indian Ocean.

References

External links
Type strain of Microbacterium indicum at BacDive -  the Bacterial Diversity Metadatabase	

Bacteria described in 2007
indicum